The Bayer designation Pi Ursae Minoris (π UMi, π Ursae Minoris) is shared by two star systems, π1 Ursae Minoris and π2 Ursae Minoris, in the constellation Ursa Minor. They are separated by 0.64° on the sky.

 π1 Ursae Minoris
 π2 Ursae Minoris

Ursa Minor (constellation)
Ursae Minoris, Pi